Terrenate may either refer to:

 Indonesia
An alternative name for Ternate, an island and town in the Maluku Islands
 Mexico
Terrenate, Sonora 
Terrenate, Tlaxcala